The most common track gauge in Chile is the Indian gauge .

Indian gauge
Valparaíso Metro
Biotren
Metrotrén
TerraSur
 Regional Train Talca - Constitución, on the Maule Region

Standard gauge
 Santiago Metro

Metre gauge
 Arica–La Paz railway
 Ferrocarril de Antofagasta a Bolivia
 Ferronor \

3' 6" gauge
 Maria Elena - Tocopilla railway

See also
Rail transport in Chile

References 

Chile
Rail transport in Chile